The copyright law of the United States has a long and complicated history, dating back to colonial times. It was established as federal law with the Copyright Act of 1790. This act was updated many times, including a major revision in 1976.

Colonial era 

The British Statute of Anne did not apply to the American colonies. The colonies' economy was largely agrarian, and copyright law was not a priority. As a result, only three private copyright acts were passed prior to 1783. Two of the acts were limited to seven years, the other to five years.

1783 to 1787 

In 1783, several authors' petitions persuaded the Continental Congress "that nothing is more properly a man's own than the fruit of his study, and that the protection and security of literary property would greatly tend to encourage genius and to promote useful discoveries." However, under the Articles of Confederation, the Continental Congress had no authority to issue a copyright. Instead it passed a resolution encouraging the States to "secure to the authors or publishers of any new book not hitherto printed ... the copy right of such books for a certain time not less than fourteen years from the first publication; and to secure to the said authors, if they shall survive the term first mentioned, ... the copy right of such books for another term of time no less than fourteen years." Three states had already enacted copyright statutes in 1783 prior to the Continental Congress resolution, and in the subsequent three years all of the remaining states except Delaware passed a copyright statute.  Seven of the States followed the Statute of Anne and the Continental Congress' resolution by providing two fourteen-year terms. The five remaining States granted copyright for single terms of fourteen, twenty and twenty one years, with no right of renewal.

Prior to the passage of the United States Constitution, several states passed their own copyright laws between 1783 and 1787, the first being Connecticut. Contemporary scholars and patriots such as Noah Webster, John Trumbull, and Joel Barlow were instrumental in securing the passage of these statutes.

United States Constitution

Copyright Clause 

At the Constitutional Convention of 1787 both James Madison of Virginia and Charles C. Pinckney of South Carolina submitted proposals that would allow Congress the power to grant copyright for a limited time. These proposals are the origin of the Copyright Clause in the United States Constitution, which states:

This clause is understood to grant Congress the power to enact copyright laws. The Copyright Clause forms the basis for both U.S. copyright law ("Science", "Authors", "Writings") and patent law ("useful Arts", "Inventors", "Discoveries"), and requires that these exclusive rights expire ("for limited Times").

Failed bill of rights provision 
Thomas Jefferson, who strongly advocated the ability of the public to share and build upon the works of others, suggested limiting copyright duration in the Bill of Rights, proposing the language:

Early federal copyright law

Copyright Act of 1790 

The Congress first exercised its copyright powers with the Copyright Act of 1790.  This act granted authors the exclusive right to publish and vend "maps, charts and books" for a term of 14 years. This 14-year term was renewable for one additional 14-year term, if the author was alive at the end of the first time. With exception of the provision on maps and charts the Copyright Act of 1790 is copied almost verbatim from the Statute of Anne.

The 1790 Act did not regulate other kinds of writings, such as musical compositions or newspapers and specifically noted that it did not prohibit copying the works of foreign authors. Foreign works were still unprotected after the 1831 and 1870 Copright Acts, though from the 1820s the US started entering into bilateral agreements with other countries. The Chace Act of 1891 enforced copyright of all foreign countries who reciprocally protected US copyright. Various groups representing the interests of British authors had made petitions regarding copyright in 1837, 1838, 1853, 1868, 1870, 1878, and 1880.

The vast majority of writings were never registered. Between 1790 and 1799, of approximately 13,000 titles published in the United States, only 556 works were registered. Under the 1790 Act, federal copyright protection was only granted if the author met certain "statutory formalities." For example, authors were required to include a proper copyright notice. If formalities were not met, the work immediately entered into the public domain.

And while musical compositions were not explicitly protected by the 1790 Act, its protection of "books" encompassed printed musical works. The first registration of a copyright in a musical composition in the United States was The Kentucky Volunteer in 1794. However, later accounts of the 1790 Act frequently misunderstand this point.

Copyright Act of 1831 

Congress first revised the copyright laws with the Copyright Act of 1831. This act extended the original copyright term from 14 years to 28 years (with an option to renew), and changed the copyright formality requirements.

In 1834, the Supreme Court ruled in Wheaton v. Peters (a case similar to the British Donaldson v Beckett of 1774) that although the author of an unpublished work had a common law right to control the first publication of that work, the author did not have a common law right to control reproduction following the first publication of the work.

During the American Civil War, the law of the Confederate States of America on copyright was broadly the same as that of the existing Copyright Act of 1831: twenty-eight years with an extension for fourteen, with mandatory registration. This was passed into law by an act in May 1861, shortly after the outbreak of hostilities. A later amendment, in April 1863, provided that any copyright registered in the United States before secession, and held by a current Confederate citizen or resident, was legally valid within the Confederacy. Confederate copyrights were apparently honored after the end of the war; when federal copyright records were transferred to the Library of Congress in 1870.

Pan-American Convention of 1910  
The Buenos Aires Convention of 1910, commonly known as the Third Pan-American Convention, provided mutual recognition of copyright between most countries in the Americas, and was ratified by the United States in 1911. Canada and some other countries or colonies were not signatories.

Pre-1976 dual state and federal copyright law 

Before the 1976 Copyright Act, copyright protection was provided by a dual system under both federal and state laws. Federal law provided "statutory copyright" and the laws of each state provided "common law copyright." Roughly speaking, the old "statutory copyright" protected works that were registered and the old "common-law copyright" protected unregistered works.

With the 1976 Copyright Act, Congress abolished the dual federal-and-state copyright system, replacing it with a single federal copyright system.

The preemption is complete insofar as works fall within the federal copyright statute. A work that falls generally within the subject matter of copyright (such as a writing) must either qualify to be protected under federal law, or it cannot be protected at all. State law cannot provide protection for a work that federal law does not protect. It covers enforcement too. A person accused of copyright infringement cannot be prosecuted in state courts.

State copyright law is not preempted by non-protected works. For example, those that have "not been fixed in any tangible medium of expression are not covered." "Examples would include choreography that has never been filmed or notated, an extemporaneous speech, original works of authorship communicated solely through conversations or live broadcasts, a dramatic sketch or musical composition improvised or developed from memory and without being recorded or written down."

Major amendments to federal copyright law 

Since 1790, Congress has amended federal copyright law numerous times. Major amendments include:
Copyright Act of 1790 – established U.S. copyright with term of 14 years with 14-year renewal
Copyright Act of 1831 – extended the term to 28 years with 14-year renewal
Copyright Act of 1909 – extended term to 28 years with 28-year renewal
Copyright Act of 1976 – extended term to either 75 years or the life of the author plus 50 years (prior to this, "[t]he interim renewal acts of 1962 through 1974 ensured that the copyright in any work in its second term as of September 19, 1962, would not expire before Dec. 31, 1976."); extended federal copyright to unpublished works; preempted state copyright laws; codified much copyright doctrine that had originated in case law
Berne Convention Implementation Act of 1988 – established copyrights of U.S. works in Berne Convention countries
Copyright Renewal Act of 1992 – removed the requirement for renewal
Uruguay Round Agreements Act (URAA) of 1994 – restored U.S. copyright for certain foreign works
Copyright Term Extension Act of 1998 – extended terms to 95/120 years or life plus 70 years
Digital Millennium Copyright Act of 1998 (DMCA) – criminalized some cases of copyright infringement and established the Section 512 notice-and-takedown regime.
 Music Modernization Act (MMA) of 2018 – Modernized copyright-related issues for music and other audio recordings to address technological developments such as digital streaming. Title II of the MMA, the CLASSICS Act, preempted state copyright laws for sound recordings made before February 15, 1972.

Key international agreements affecting U.S. copyright law include:
Universal Copyright Convention
Berne Convention for the Protection of Literary and Artistic Works
Agreement on Trade-Related Aspects of Intellectual Property Rights (TRIPS)

The United States ratified the Universal Copyright Convention in 1954, and again in 1971. This treaty was developed by UNESCO as an alternative to the Berne Convention.

The United States became a Berne Convention signatory in 1988. The Berne Convention entered into force in the U.S. a year later, on March 1, 1989. The U.S. is also a party to TRIPS, which requires compliance with Berne provisions, and is enforceable under the World Trade Organization dispute resolution process.

To meet the treaty requirements, copyright protection was extended to architecture (where previously only building plans were protected, not buildings themselves), and certain moral rights of visual artists.

Notable cases 

Fixation
 White-Smith Music Publishing Company v. Apollo Company (1908)
 Midway Manufacturing Co. v. Artic International, Inc. (N.D. Ill. 1982)

Originality
 Burrow-Giles Lithographic Co. v. Sarony (1884)
 Bridgeman Art Library v. Corel Corp. (SDNY 1999)

Idea/expression dichotomy
 Baker v. Selden (1880)
 Whelan v. Jaslow (1986)
 Broderbund v. Unison (N.D. Cal. 1986)
 Computer Associates Int'l, Inc. v. Altai Inc. (2d Cir. 1992)

Fair use
 Suntrust v. Houghton Mifflin (11th Cir. 2001) (re Parody)

References 

United States copyright law
Economic history of the United States